The Spice SE92P is an IMSA GTP sports prototype race car, designed, developed and built by British manufacturer Spice Engineering, for sports car racing, in 1992.

References

Sports prototypes
IMSA GTP cars